Scott Joseph Cooper (born 16 June 1970) is an Irish-English professional football manager.

Cooper last served as the head coach of the Philippines national football team. He has coaching experiences with the Huntsville Fire, Chester City, Anguilla national football team, Montserrat national football team, Leicester City, the Independent Schools Football Association (ISFA) England Under-15 National Football Team.

Managerial career

Early career

Cooper has coached the Anguilla and Montserrat national teams.

Buriram United
Cooper was picked by Buriram United to replace Attaphol Buspakom after 2013 AFC Champions League against FC Seoul along with his assistant Darren Read.

On his arrival at Buriram United Cooper found the club in third place of the Thai Premier League, five points adrift of the league leaders. Under Cooper's managerial reign, Buriram were unbeaten in the Thai Premier League, AFC Champions League, Thai FA Cup and Thai League Cup.

Buriram United won 23 out of 29 matches, drawing five and losing only once under Cooper. The club won all their away games at the top four Thai clubs during the season. Named "Manager of the Month" in June 2013, Cooper has led Buriram United to the top 10 club rankings in Asia, creating history for the Thai club in the process. Under Cooper's tutelage, Buriram on an average scored 3.1 goals per game whilst conceding 0.75 goals per game.

Cooper also had a major influence on developing Thai players in his squad, as nine Thai players were called up to the national team.

Muangthong United
On 2 January 2014, Muanthong United officially appointed Cooper as the head coach.

Mitra Kukar
On 11 December 2014, Mitra Kukar officially appointed Cooper as the head coach.

Ubon UMT United 
In April 2015, Ubon UMT United officially appointed Cooper as the head coach.

Philippines
In June 2018, Cooper was appointed as Senior team adviser of the Philippines (Interim). Scott Cooper was later tasked to oversee the national team's training camp in Bahrain in September 2018 in lieu of the newly appointed head coach Terry Butcher who resigned from his post in August 2018. Cooper's interim tenure ended in late August 2018 when he was officially named as the regular head coach of the Philippine national team.

On 27 October 2018, Sven-Göran Eriksson took over as manager of the Philippines and Cooper assisted Eriksson in the Philippines' stint at the 2018 AFF Championship and 2019 Asian Cup.

Cooper returned as manager in January 2019 after the conclusion of the Philippines' campaign in the continental tournament and Eriksson's short-term contract. Under Cooper, the Philippines gained its highest ever World Cup point total.

In May 2022, it was announced that Cooper has stepped down as head coach of the Philippines men’s national team.

ADT
Cooper coached the Azkals Development Team, a football club meant for national team youth prospects. He mentored the team during the 2020 Philippines Football League season. He was succeeded by Giovanni Villagracia in the following season.

Managerial statistics

 A win or loss by the penalty shoot-out is regarded as the draw in time.

Honours

Manager
Ubon United
Regional League Division 2: 2015

References 

1970 births
Living people
Footballers from Sheffield
Association football fullbacks
Association football wingers
English footballers
Republic of Ireland association footballers
Oxford United F.C. players
South Florida Bulls men's soccer players
English expatriate footballers
Republic of Ireland expatriate association footballers
English expatriate sportspeople in the United States
Irish expatriate sportspeople in the United States
Expatriate soccer players in the United States
Eastern Indoor Soccer League coaches
English football managers
Republic of Ireland football managers
English expatriate football managers
Republic of Ireland expatriate football managers
Expatriate football managers in Anguilla
Anguilla national football team managers
Expatriate football managers in Montserrat
Montserrat national football team managers
Scott Cooper
Scott Cooper
Scott Cooper
Scott Cooper
Expatriate football managers in Thailand
Expatriate football managers in Indonesia
Indonesia Super League managers
Mitra Kukar managers
Philippines national football team managers
Eastern Indoor Soccer League players
English expatriate sportspeople in Montserrat
English expatriate sportspeople in Anguilla
English expatriate sportspeople in Thailand
English expatriate sportspeople in Indonesia
English expatriate sportspeople in the Philippines
English expatriate sportspeople in Ireland
English people of Irish descent
Irish expatriate sportspeople in Montserrat
Irish expatriate sportspeople in Anguilla
Irish expatriate sportspeople in Thailand
Irish expatriate sportspeople in Indonesia
Irish expatriate sportspeople in the Philippines